Cynthia Holmes Belcher (1 December 1827 – 22 March 1911) was an American journalist born in Lunenburg, Vermont.

Early life
She was the daughter of the Hon. George E. and Mary Moore Holmes. Her father served as a member of the State Senate and as judge in Essex County. Holmes was educated in the academy in St. Johnsbury, Vermont. Her father removed her family of seven daughters from St. Johnsbury to Port Byron, Illinois, when she was eighteen years old.

In her twentieth year she was married to Nathaniel Belcher, a descendant of prominent New England people and one of the pioneers in the settlement of Illinois. He held various offices of trust and was a member of the Whig Party that nominated General Winfield Scott for the presidency, and was a prolific political writer.

They travelled extensively. In 1881, they visited Colorado, and in 1882 went to California, where they passed a pleasant year. Their tour included all parts of the Union. On one of their visits to Washington, D.C., they were received by President Franklin Pierce, and on a later occasion visited President Grant in the White House.

Career
After the death of her husband and two children, Belcher returned to New England and settled in Boston where she developed her literary, artistic, and musical talents. She studied singing in the New England Conservatory of Music and gradually became known as a contributor to leading newspapers. She was a member of the New England Woman's Press Association.

In 1889, she visited Europe and contributed letters on her travels through the different countries, also describing the Paris Exposition.

Besides her literary work, she has been identified with works of reform and with church and temperance work, the suffrage movement in particular receiving much thought and labor from her.

References
  
 

People from Lunenburg, Vermont
1827 births
1911 deaths
19th-century American journalists
American women journalists
American newspaper journalists
19th-century American women writers
Wikipedia articles incorporating text from A Woman of the Century